Beijing City Xicheng District China-Cuba Friendship Primary School is a public primary school with its main campus in , Xicheng District, Beijing. In addition to the Sanlihe Campus (三里河校区) the school also has the Nanlishi Road Campus (南礼士路校区).

It was established in 1954. It received its current name in 1964 due to a name change imposed by the Chinese Ministry of Foreign Affairs.

There had been multiple international exchange events between the school and Cuba after the rename.

See also
 China–Cuba relations

References

Further reading

External links
  

Public primary schools in China
Schools in Xicheng District
China–Cuba relations